Pimelea erecta is a species of flowering plant in the family Thymelaeaceae and is endemic to the southwest of Western Australia. It is an erect, often spreading shrub with elliptic to egg-shaped leaves arranged in opposite pairs, and clusters of erect, white or pale pink flowers.

Description
The stamens and style extend beyond the end of the flower tube. Flowering occurs between July and March with a peak between October and January.

Taxonomy
Pimelea erecta was first formally described in 1988 by Barbara Lynette Rye and the description was published in the journal Nuytsia. The specific epithet (erecta) refers to the flowers and involucral bracts.

Distribution and habitat
This pimelea grows in sand or clay between the Ongerup and Israelite Bay in the Avon Wheatbelt, Coolgardie, Esperance Plains, Jarrah Forest and Mallee bioregions of south-western Western Australia.

Conservation status
Pimelea erecta is listed as "not threatened" by the Government of Western Australia Department of Biodiversity, Conservation and Attractions.

References

erecta
Malvales of Australia
Flora of Western Australia
Plants described in 1988
Taxa named by Barbara Lynette Rye